The 2013 USARL season was the third season of the USA Rugby League (USARL). The 2013 season kicked off on Saturday, June 1, and ended with the Championship Final on Saturday, August 24, in Conshohocken, Pennsylvania. The Philadelphia Fight won a double, capturing their second USARL major premiership and their first USARL minor premiership.

Teams 
The USARL had planned to split 8 teams into 2 conferences to reduce travel costs. However, Oneida FC and the New Haven Warriors folded shortly before the beginning of the season, leaving the league with just 6 teams. Given the reduced number of teams, the USARL decided to retain the single table structure.

Regular season 
Teams qualified for the playoffs based on points, with a win counting for 2 points, a draw for 1, and a loss for 0. There were no bonus points for tries or close losses. Tiebreaker order was (1) head-to-head points, (2) head-to-head aggregate score, and (3) overall point differential.

Source: USARL website.

The Fight outscored the Axemen 60–58 in aggregate over their two matches, giving the Fight the minor premiership. The Slayers qualified for fourth place over the Thirteens on point differential.

Playoffs 
The playoffs consisted of a two-round single-elimination tournament. The four teams with the most points competed in a semi-final round, with the two winners going on to the Championship Final. In the semi-final round, the first-place team hosted the fourth-place, and the second-place team hosted the third-place.

References

External links 
 

USARL season
USA Rugby League
Seasons in American rugby league
2013 in American sports